Nemegt may refer to:

Nemegt Basin, a topographical feature in the Gobi Desert region of Mongolia
Nemegt Formation, a geological rock formation in the Gobi Desert region of Mongolia